André Philip (28 June 1902 – 5 July 1970) was a SFIO member who served in 1942 as Interior Minister under the Free French provisional government of General Charles de Gaulle. He also served as a finance minister in 1946 and part of 1947 in the Socialist‐led governments of Felix Gouin, Leon Blum and Paul Ramadier.

References

External links
 

1902 births
1970 deaths
People from Pont-Saint-Esprit
French Protestants
Politicians from Occitania (administrative region)
French Section of the Workers' International politicians
Unified Socialist Party (France) politicians
French Ministers of Finance
French interior ministers
Members of the 16th Chamber of Deputies of the French Third Republic
Members of the Constituent Assembly of France (1945)
Members of the Constituent Assembly of France (1946)
Deputies of the 1st National Assembly of the French Fourth Republic
French Resistance members